The 2019 Campeonato Ecuatoriano de Fútbol Serie A (officially known as the LigaPro Banco Pichincha 2019 for sponsorship reasons) was the 61st season of the Serie A, Ecuador's top tier football league, and the first under the management of the Liga Profesional de Fútbol del Ecuador (or LigaPro). LDU Quito were the defending champions, but were defeated in the finals by Delfín following a scoreless draw on aggregate score after two legs and a penalty shootout, in which the latter team won their first league title.

Format
Starting from this season, the league was expanded from 12 to 16 teams and a new format was implemented. The first stage will be played as a double round-robin tournament with all teams playing each other twice, once at home and once away, for a total of 30 matches. The top eight teams at the end of the first stage will qualify for the playoffs, which will consist of three rounds: quarterfinals, semifinals, and final.

In the quarterfinals, the eight qualified teams were split into four ties to be played on a home-and-away basis: the best-placed team in the first round played against the eighth-best team, the second-best team against the seventh-best, and so on. The four winners advanced to the semifinals, with the winners of this stage playing the finals. In case of a tie in points and goals scored in the quarterfinals and semifinals, the best-placed team in each tie (according to the first stage standings) advanced to the following stage, whilst in a case of a tie in points and goals for in the final, a penalty shootout would be played to decide the champion.

Teams
Sixteen teams competed in the 2019 Serie A season, twelve of whom took part in the previous season. El Nacional and Guayaquil City would have been relegated from Serie A after accumulating the fewest points during the 2018 season, however, the expansion of the league prevented their relegation to Serie B. The four remaining spots in the top tier were filled by the top four teams in Serie B in the previous season: Mushuc Runa, América de Quito, Fuerza Amarilla and Olmedo.

Stadia and locations

Personnel and kits

Managerial changes

First stage
The First stage began on February 8 and ended on November 3. The top eight teams at the end of this stage advanced to the playoffs, while the bottom two were relegated.

Results

Playoffs

Quarter-finals

|}

First leg

Second leg

Semi-finals

|}

First leg

Second leg

Finals

Tied 0–0 on aggregate, Delfín won on penalties.

International qualification

Top goalscorers

Source: Soccerway

See also
 Ecuadorian Serie A
 2019 in Ecuadorian football
 2019 Ecuadorian Serie B
 2019 Súperliga Femenina
 2019 Ecuadorian Women's Serie B

References

External links
Official website 

Ecuadorian Serie A seasons
Ecuador
Serie A